The Bulaka River is a river in southern Western Papua, in the Papua province, Indonesia.

Geography
The river flows in the southern area of Papua with predominantly tropical monsoon climate (designated as Am in the Köppen-Geiger climate classification). The annual average temperature in the area is 23 °C. The warmest month is October, when the average temperature is around 26 °C, and the coldest is June, at 20 °C. The average annual rainfall is 2155 mm. The wettest month is February, with an average of 356 mm rainfall, and the driest is August, with 16 mm rainfall.

See also
List of rivers of Indonesia
List of rivers of Western New Guinea

References

Rivers of South Papua
Rivers of Indonesia